was a Japanese singer and actress. She was a founding member of Hello! Project J-pop group Country Musume. She joined Country Musume in 1999 along with Rinne Toda and Azusa Kobayashi. On July 16, 1999, Yanagihara was killed in a car accident one week before the group's first release, Futari no Hokkaidou on July 23, 1999.

Acts

Movies 
 1998 –

TV shows 
 1999-07-13 – Idol o Sagase

Dramas 
 1998-04-06 – 
 1998-07-09 – 
 1998-10-11 –

External links
 Necrology from Nikkan Sports

1979 births
1999 deaths
Country Musume members
Japanese idols
Road incident deaths in Japan
Japanese women pop singers
Japanese actresses
Musicians from Chiba Prefecture
20th-century Japanese women singers
20th-century Japanese singers